Vaalogonopodidae is a family of millipedes belonging to the order Polydesmida.

Genera:
 Phygoxerotes Verhoeff, 1939
 Vaalogonopus Verhoeff, 1940

References

Polydesmida